The Mountain Conservation Trust of Georgia (MCTGA) is a 501(c)3 nonprofit land trust that promotes land protection, collaborative partnerships and education in order to conserve natural resources, especially the mountains and foothills of North Georgia, founded in 1991.

It has since been accredited by the Land Trust Alliance's Accreditation Commission in 2008.

References

External links 
 

Land trusts in the United States
Environmental organizations based in Georgia (U.S. state)
Protected areas of Georgia (U.S. state)
1991 establishments in Georgia (U.S. state)